Plymouth Meeting Mall is a  shopping mall in the community of Plymouth Meeting in Plymouth Township, Pennsylvania, approximately  northwest of Center City, Philadelphia.  It is located at Germantown Pike and Hickory Road, near the Mid-County Interchange between the Pennsylvania Turnpike (I-276) and the Northeast Extension/Blue Route (I-476).  The mall was built by The Rouse Company in 1966. The mall features a fountain and a carousel.

Plymouth Meeting Mall currently contains more than 70 specialty stores and restaurants, including a central Food Court, and outlying restaurants California Pizza Kitchen, P.F. Chang's, Redstone American Grill, Dave & Buster's, and Benihana. Its original anchor stores Strawbridge & Clothier and Lit Brothers are now occupied by Burlington, Dick's Sporting Goods, Michaels, and Edge Fitness - which all occupy an anchor space that was Macy's until 2017 - and Boscov's. The Boscov's site was home to one of the largest branches of Hess's until 1993. There is also a  AMC Theatre on the property, featuring 12 screens and stadium seating.  The Plymouth Meeting Mall was one of the first malls in North America which, among its mixture of various stores, offered a church within the mall.  The mall is owned and managed by Pennsylvania Real Estate Investment Trust (PREIT). 

The mall is recognizable from a considerable distance away due to an adjoining nine-story office tower, One Plymouth Meeting.  The tower, containing  of office space, is managed by Mack-Cali Realty Corporation.

The mall is currently anchored by Boscov's, Burlington, Dick's Sporting Goods, Michaels, Edge Fitness, Whole Foods Market and an AMC Theatre.

History

The Plymouth Meeting Mall was designed by Victor Gruen and built by The Rouse Company in 1966, it was the third fully enclosed shopping mall in the Philadelphia area.  The original two anchor stores were Strawbridge & Clothier and Lit Brothers.  The One Plymouth Meeting office tower was added on an outparcel in 1969.  The mall suffered a major fire on January 10, 1970 at the east end (near Lit Brothers): "Approximately one third of the 100 stores in the suburban Philadelphia mall were damaged by either smoke, water or the fire."  Lit Brothers closed in 1976 and was replaced by Hess's in 1979. The Hess's, which was the only location in the Philadelphia area, saw poor sales and closed in March 1993 as part of restructuring of the Allentown-based chain.  The former Hess's became Boscov's on October 13, 1996.

In 2003, The Rouse Company sold the Plymouth Meeting Mall along with the Cherry Hill Mall, Echelon Mall (renamed Voorhees Town Center in 2007), Exton Square Mall, Moorestown Mall, and The Gallery at Market East to PREIT for $548 million.  In 2005, Federated Department Stores purchased May Department Stores, the owners of Strawbridge's, and converted several Strawbridge's locations to Macy's, including the store at Plymouth Meeting Mall. Strawbridge's became Macy's in 2006.

A redevelopment of over $100 million in 2007-2009 added new restaurants and an open-air "Lifestyle" wing featuring LOFT, Coldwater Creek (since closed), Jos. A. Bank (since closed), Chico's and Olly Shoes (since closed). During the redevelopment, in April 2009, a two-story chain arcade called Krazy City was constructed in the mall's interior, near Boscov's, taking up several store spaces.  A  Whole Foods upscale grocery market was included in the redevelopment and anchors the "Outdoor Lifestyle Wing" of the property, which also includes an underground parking area. Previously, this location gained fame in 1985 when Swedish furniture company IKEA purchased and renovated an outparcel space for its first U.S. location.  IKEA later moved in early 2003 to its current site at 400 Alan Wood Road, off of Interstate 476 (the "Blue Route") in nearby Conshohocken.

In recent years, the interior of the Plymouth Meeting Mall has seen an increase in vacancies, with sales of $320 per square foot in the three months ended September 2015. In 2019, the non-anchor occupancy rate was 81.3%.

In December 2009, Krazy City closed its doors in accordance with the chain's folding. In 2012, its space was converted to Mercy Health Center as part of Mercy Suburban Hospital. In late 2013, a casual Mexican chain restaurant opened in the second floor mall entrance wing next to Macy's and across from Dave & Busters, called Uncle Julio's. In 2015, Mercy Suburban Hospital was sold to Prime Healthcare Services, which re-branded the hospital and renamed the center Suburban Health Center. 

In 2015, it was announced that a  Legoland Discovery Center would be constructed at the Plymouth Meeting Mall, replacing a portion of the food court. Construction began in the summer of 2016 and Legoland opened in April 2017.

On January 4, 2017, Suburban Health Center was announced to have closed. On the same day, Macy's announced that its store would be closing in spring 2017 as part of a plan to close 68 stores nationwide.  On January 28, 2017, Uncle Julio's closed its restaurant.  On March 26, 2017, Macy's officially closed its store.  In July 2017, it was announced that a 5 Wits amusement center would open on the lower level of the mall, just across from Legoland Discovery Center, taking up almost five store spaces.  The 5 Wits center opened on October 20, 2017 and closed January 2020. 

In August 2018, it was announced that Burlington, Dick's Sporting Goods, Michaels, and Edge Fitness would occupy the former Macy's space, with all tenants opening in October 2019.

As of 2022, PREIT is attempting to get approval for a 503-unit apartment community to be built on the mall property.

References

External links

 Plymouth Meeting Mall Web Site.

Shopping malls in Pennsylvania
Shopping malls established in 1966
Tourist attractions in Montgomery County, Pennsylvania
Buildings and structures in Montgomery County, Pennsylvania
Pennsylvania Real Estate Investment Trust
1966 establishments in Pennsylvania
Plymouth Meeting, Pennsylvania